PATRIC (Pathosystems Resource Integration Center) is a bacterial bioinformatic website from the Bioinformatics Resource Center. It is an information system integrating databases with various types of data about bacterial pathogens (transcriptomic, proteomic, structure, biochemical) together with analysis tools. It is designed to support the biomedical research community's work on bacterial infectious diseases via these integrations of various pieces of pathogen information.

Description
PATRIC, is a project of Virginia Tech's Cyberinfrastructure Division, and is funded by the National Institutes of Allergy and Infectious Diseases (NIAID), a component of the National Institutes of Health (NIH). PATRIC centralize available bacterial phylogenomic data, proteomic and other various experiment pieces of data linked to specific pathogens from numerous sources. The PATRIC platform provides an interface comprehensive comparative genomics.

Bacterial Organisms Covered in the PATRIC Database
 Bacillus
 Bartonella
 Borrelia
 Brucella
 Burkholderia
 Campylobacter
 Chlamydophila
 Clostridium
 Coxiella
 Ehrlichia
 Escherichia
 Francisella
 Helicobacter
 Listeria
 Mycobacterium
 Rickettsia
 Salmonella
 Shigella
 Staphylococcus
 Vibrio
 Yersinia
 Other Bacteria

About Cyberinfrastructure Division and VBI
The CyberInfrastructure Division at VBI develops methods, infrastructure, and resources to help enable scientific discoveries in infectious disease research. The group applies the principles of cyberinfrastructure to integrate data, computational infrastructure, and people. CyberInfrastructure Division has developed public resources for curated, diverse molecular and literature data from various infectious disease systems, and implemented the processes, systems, and databases required to support them. It also conducts research by applying its methods and data to make new discoveries of its own.

The Virginia Bioinformatics Institute (VBI) at Virginia Tech has a research platform centered on understanding the "disease triangle" of host-pathogen-environment interactions in plants, humans and other animals.

See also

 Pathogenic bacteria
 Infectious disease
 Antimicrobial Resistance databases

References

External links
 
 Bioinformatics Resource Centers The NIAID page describing the goals and activities of the BRCs
 Pathogen Portal Hub site for the five BRCs; provides cross-BRC summary information

Antimicrobial resistance organizations
Biological databases